Freshwater acidification occurs when acidic inputs enter a body of fresh water through the weathering of rocks, invasion of acidifying gas (e.g. carbon dioxide), or by the reduction of acid anions, like sulfate and nitrate within a lake. Freshwater acidification is primarily caused by sulfur oxides (SOx) and nitrogen oxides (NOx) entering the water from atmospheric depositions and soil leaching. Carbonic acid and dissolved carbon dioxide can also enter freshwaters in a similar manner associated with runoff through carbon dioxide-rich soils. Runoff that contains these compounds may incorporate acidifying hydrogen ions and inorganic aluminum, which can be toxic to marine organisms. Acid rain is also a contributor to freshwater acidification. It is created when SOx and NOx react with water, oxygen, and other oxidants within the clouds.

What contributes to freshwater acidification? 
The buffering capacity of soils and bedrocks within the freshwater ecosystem can contribute to the acidity of the water. Each freshwater reservoir has a capacity to resist changes in pH, but an excess input of acids into the reservoir can cause the buffering capacity to decrease, eventually causing the water to become more acidic. An increase in atmospheric CO2 affects freshwater acidity as the more of it dissolves into the water, the more acidic it becomes. It is difficult to quantify the effects of anthropogenic CO2 due to the various carbon fluxes in freshwater ecosystems. High levels of freshwater acidification is harmful to various aquatic organisms. Nonetheless, there are many freshwater systems, including the Great Lakes, where the pH level could be decreasing, most likely due to CO2 accumulation in the atmosphere however, increased monitoring is necessary to determine the full effects of acidification on pH levels.

Freshwater vs. ocean acidification 

The ocean and the atmosphere are constantly exchanging massive amounts of CO2. Over the last 800,000 years, the concentration of CO2 in the atmosphere has remained around 172-300 parts per million by volume (ppmv). With increases of anthropogenic CO2 emissions, this number has risen to 387 ppmv in 2009. From 2000-2008, 26% of anthropogenic CO2 was absorbed by the ocean. CO2 is the primary factor affecting ocean pH, though other aspects can also play a role. When dissolved in water, CO2 acts as a weak acid that primarily affects carbonate chemistry. Dissolved CO2 increases the concentration of bicarbonate ions (HCO3−), dissolved inorganic carbon (CT) and lowers the pH. Similar to oceans, freshwater bodies also absorb atmospheric CO2, lowering the pH. In addition to CO2, freshwater reservoir's pH values are altered by acid rain, nutrient runoff, and anthropogenic pollutants. Freshwater takes up CO2 in the same mechanism as seawater; however, freshwater alkalinity is much more variable  than seawater, due to differences in rocks present in the watershed and decreased salt concentrations. Without this salt-buffer, pH changes in freshwater tend to be more pronounced than in ocean water. In freshwater systems, newly released H+ ions are not buffered by as many bicarbonate (HCO3−) ions as ocean water. Therefore, freshwater biota tends to have a higher evolutionary pH tolerance than seawater biota.

Causes

CO2 
Carbon dioxide reacts with water to form carbonic acid, bicarbonate, carbonate, and acidic protons via the following equilibria:

 (aq) + H2O  H2CO3  HCO3− + H+  CO32− + 2 H+

Dissociation of carbonic acid decreases the pH of the solution.  The degree of dissociation is controlled by the overall chemistry of the solution; in particular, alkalinity and temperature are primary controlling factors.  There has been a clear increase of pCO2 in some freshwater ecosystems in the last century due to anthropogenic influence that is contributing to freshwater acidification. It is often difficult to quantify the role of increasing pCO2 (partial pressure) in freshwater due to the various sources of carbon dioxide and the many factors that affect it, such as the surrounding landscape, climate, the organisms present, the water's chemistry, and biological processes (e.g. photosynthesis, respiration). The dominant type of inorganic carbon present in freshwater can indicate pH levels, with more CO32- being present in basic water and free CO2 in acidic water, seen as when it dissolves into the surface of freshwater it reacts to form carbonic acid. Along with the overall trend of increasing CO2 in the atmosphere that is being absorbed by bodies of water, the levels of carbon dioxide fluctuate daily and seasonally.

SOx and NOx 
Two of the other main contributors to freshwater acidification are sulfur oxides and nitric oxides. The accelerated burning of fossil fuels over the past two centuries has largely contributed to the acidification of freshwater ecosystems. International cooperation and environmental legislation have reduced SOx and NOx in recent decades as sulfate emissions peaked in the 1970s, with nitrogen following behind 10 years later.  Increased sulfate concentration in runoff due to increased acidity inputs coupled with both an increase in base cation run-off and a decrease of bicarbonate, creates the acidifying effects in aquatic systems. Acidic rain seeps into and reacts with clay particles in the soil which leads to the leaching of aluminum into nearby bodies of water. Thus, as the pH levels decrease, aluminum levels will increase. The higher levels of aluminum pose a risk of contamination to drinking water which can lead to several health diseases. This creates a toxic environment to marine species and their environment which can lead to extinction, reductions in population size, and an overall decrease in biodiversity. Most of the nitrogen in its natural state found in terrestrial ecosystems will be utilized by vegetation. However, in large amounts, not all of it is can be taken up by vegetation so the excess gets washed away with runoff in the form of nitrate, which contributes to acidification in the same manner as sulfate.

Buffering capacity 

The buffering capacity of ecosystems help them resist changes in pH. When this is lacking in an ecosystem, it can lead to the acidification of its freshwater. For example, the Atlantic region of Canada has the lowest acid deposition rates in Eastern North America, yet it has the most acidic waters on the continent. This is due to the low buffering capacity of the regional bedrock and the addition of natural organic acids produced by close by wetlands. Specifically, in Southwestern and Eastern Nova Scotia, there is a combination of high organic acidity, poor buffering, and high acid deposition to produce a very low surface water pH and acid neutralization capacity (ANC) values. In most of the Atlantic region, granite and shale bedrock are found, which contain very little buffering material. Soil formed from low-buffering materials and the waters that drain from them are, therefore, susceptible to acidification, even under low acid deposition. Soil that undergoes acidification can, in turn, have negative repercussions on agriculture. Some species are able to withstand low pH levels in their environment. For example, frogs and perches can withstand a pH level of 4. This allows these species to be unaffected to the acid deposition in their aquatic environment, allowing them to survive in these conditions. However, most aquatic species such as clams and snails are unable to withstand low pH levels which negatively impacts their growth and survival. The high acidic levels deteriorate their thick shells decreasing their protection from predators.

Harmful effects on aquatic ecosystems 
Acidification of freshwater ecosystems may have significant negative effects. Changes in pH as a result of freshwater acidification imposes physiological challenges on individual organisms, may decrease native biodiversity, and can alter ecosystem structure and function entirely. Macro-invertebrates and large vertebrates alike are particularly sensitive to acidification; these species exhibit higher mortality and lower reproductive rates under acidified conditions. These species are forced to expend more energy on buffering their body conditions to retain a livable pH and, therefore, must limit energy expenditure on processes such as hunting, sheltering, and reproducing. Thus, embryonic development, and species' success, is also compromised in acidified freshwaters. 

Conversely, algae thrive in acidified environments, and may quickly dominate these habitats, outcompeting other species. In most acidic freshwater reservoirs, there is an increase in the development of mosses and algae. In particular, it is common to see an increase in the abundance of the sphagnum. Sphagnum has a high capacity to exchange H+ for basic cations within freshwater. The thick layer of sphagnum restricts the exchange between surface water and sediment, further contributing to reduction in nutrient cycling in the ecosystem.

Reducing acidification

Current and emerging chemical techniques 
There are processes that can remediate the acidification of freshwaters. Liming is one such practice, where calcium carbonate (CaCO3) is added to these systems. Liming aids freshwater chemical and biological recovery by increasing pH levels and essentially helping the habitat return to a similar condition to how it was prior to acidification. Otherwise, recovery on its own would be very extensive and take a lot longer to achieve. When added to rivers, some showed positive effects on the wildlife, increasing the abundance of fish and acid-sensitive invertebrates. However, these effects are variable. In fact, other studies had results that showed a decrease in invertebrate abundance. New technologies have been developed for companies to be able to reduce their emissions of nitrogen oxide and sulfur dioxide, linked to acid rain and water acidification. These include, wet lime, gypsum denitrification, Ammonia reduction denitrification, Electron beam irradiation desulfurization and denitrification, and Pulse plasma chemical desulfurization and denitrification.

Government regulations and policies 
A large decrease of acid rain and acidic bodies of water in the past couple of decades has been a direct result of governmental regulations on anthropogenic emissions, specifically SOx and NOx. Governments have the power to make this issue a priority and invest in what is needed to mitigate it. For example, investing in scientists to monitor and collect data and allowing them to come up with a model that can be used to successfully implement policies. For instance, implementing a protocol to resolve the issue. Also, governments could invest funds to subsidize companies to decrease their pollution and allow them to use innovative methods of production, so as to lower both greenhouse gas emissions and the amount of acidic substances created. Furthermore, government institutions across the globe can connect on the issue of acidification and work together to find a feasible solution.

Public education 
Another important factor to consider when looking at reducing freshwater acidification are the choices people make to protect the environment everyday. Having a basic understanding of environmental problems, such as climate change and acid rain, can influence people to act differently. Following a circular approach to reduce, reuse and recycle can reduce resource depletion and waste minimization, including decreasing water acidity. Also, establishing school programs to ensure children learn from a young age the importance of sustainability and environmental protection. Moreover, waste separation is also fundamental as it allows for the breakdown of the chemicals that cause acid rain. And, finally, being altogether more aware of the effect human actions have on the environment to better protect the planet.

References 

Water pollution
Greenhouse gas emissions
Water chemistry
Environmental science
Hydrology